The year 1935 saw a number of significant happenings in radio broadcasting history.

Events
23 January – Station 1YA Auckland moves into the first purpose-built broadcasting premises in New Zealand.
25 January – Tsar Boris III signs a decree making all broadcasting in Bulgaria a state-organized activity.
17 February – The Droitwich medium-wave transmitter begins service in England, broadcasting the Midland Regional Programme of the BBC on a frequency of 1013 kHz.
28 April – Fireside chat by the President of the United States: On the Works Relief Program.
12 March – Reformed American gambler Kid Canfield becomes the first person to die live on radio, while making a promotional broadcast on WHIS in Bluefield, West Virginia.
24 March – The Major Bowes Amateur Hour is broadcast nationally for the first time on NBC, after having been on the New York City radio station WHN.
1 June – In Japan, NHK begins its international service, Radio Japan, with a daily one-hour programme in English and Japanese beamed towards North America.
29 July – Lux Radio Theater has its first show on CBS, after having been on NBC Blue for a year.
4 August – In Portugal, the Emissora Nacional de Radiodifusão, forerunner of today's RDP – Radiodifusão Portuguesa, is officially inaugurated.
10 December – The first broadcast commentary on a snooker match (Joe Davis v. Horace Lindrum) is given in the BBC Regional Programme.
date unknown
In preparation for the Italian invasion of Abyssinia (Ethiopia), "Radio Marina" is taken under government control.
Radio is introduced into Tunisia.

Debuts

Programs 
1 January – The Story of Mary Marlin debuts on NBC after having been on WMAQ in Chicago.
4 January – Bob Hope has his network radio debut on the variety show The Intimate Revue. 
4 January – The Beatrice Lillie Show debuts on NBC. 
4 February – Mrs. Wiggs of the Cabbage Patch debuts on CBS.
April – A deputation from the University of Wales a pproaches John Reith, head of the BBC, who agrees to Wales becoming a BBC region.
17 April – House of Glass debuts on the Blue Network. 
20 April –  Your Hit Parade (first known as just The Hit Parade or Lucky Strike Hit Parade) debuts on NBC.
27 April – Flash Gordon, a popular comic strip, debuts as a radio serial on the Mutual Broadcasting System
30 May – America's Town Meeting of the Air debuts on the Blue Network. 
30 June – Uncle Charlie's Tent Showdebuts on NBC. 
14 July – America's Hour debuts on CBS.
22 July – A Voz do Brasil debuts on Brazil's Programa Nacional (and will still be running more than 80 years later).
5 August – Backstage Wife debuts on Mutual. 
September – Jaime Yankelevich, owner of several Argentine radio stations, contracts with Radio Belgrano to produce a weekly programme of Hollywood gossip.
9 October – Cavalcade of America debuts on CBS. 
29 October – The Jumbo Fire Chief Program starring Jimmy Durante debuts on NBC.
5 December
Bing Crosby becomes guest host of the Kraft Music Hall (and the following month becomes full-time host, after Paul Whiteman).
Liberty Life Insurance sells WNOX AM of Knoxville to Continental Radio Co.
UNDATED – The Jack Berch Show debuts on the Blue Network.

Stations
20 April – WLEU, Erie, Pennsylvania, begins broadcasting on 1420 kHz with 250 W power (daytime) and 100 W (night).
1 October – KDON, Del Monte, California, begins broadcasting on 1210 kHz with 100 W power.
UNDATED – WTMV, East St. Louis, Illinois, begins broadcasting on 1500 kHz with 100 W power.

Endings
2 April – KFPM, Greenville, Texas, ends broadcast operations. The station had 15 W power, and its operator said it was "losing money every day."
23 June – The Gibson Family ends its run on network radio (NBC). 
28 June – The Beatrice Lillie Show ends its run on network radio (NBC). 
8 September – Uncle Charlie's Tent Showends its run on network radio (NBC). 
22 September – America's Hour ends its run on network radio (CBS).
25 December – House of Glass ends its run on the Blue Network.

Births
23 March – Barry Cryer, English comedy scriptwriter and performer.
15 May – Tony Butler, English radio sports presenter in the west midlands.
26 May – Sheila Steafel (died 2019), South-African born British actress.
28 July – Simon Dee, born Cyril Henty-Dodd (died 2009), English DJ.
13 October – Bruce Morrow ("Cousin Brucie"), American radio presenter.
15 November – Gillian Reynolds, English radio critic.
18 December – Rosemary Leach (died 2017), English actress.
Gary Dee (died 1995), pioneer in controversial talk radio, mostly in Cleveland, Ohio.

Deaths
6 June – George Grossmith Jr., 61, actor, theatre producer and manager, director, playwright and songwriter, Programme Advisor to BBC
15 August – Will Rogers, 55, US actor, humorist and radio personality (air crash)

References

 
Radio by year